Rin' is an all-female Japanese pop group which combines traditional Japanese musical instruments and style with elements of modern pop and rock music. It is a female trio of Tokyo National University of Fine Arts and Music alumni who graduated in 2003. The band made their performing debut in December 2003, at Meguro Gajoen, and in April 2004, their first single, called Sakitama,  was released by avex trax.

Chie Arai and Mana Yoshinaga play koto, sangen, and jushichi-gen, while Tomoca Nagasu plays biwa and shakuhachi. All three perform vocals.

According to the band's website, the name Rin' comes from the English word 'ring', the Japanese word Wa (和, meaning both 'ring' and 'Japanese-style'), and from the trio's hope to create a 'ring', or circle, of music.

Since their debut, the band has performed in many venues around the world, and have released four singles and several albums. A number of their songs have been used as themes for anime and movies, most notable is Fuhen used in the Samurai 7 anime.

Their chief international album, Inland Sea, was released worldwide: in Europe and the United States on April 25, 2006 and in Japan on August 30, 2006, featuring guest performances by Leigh Nash and Lisa Loeb.

According to the band's website, as of 13 February 2009, Rin' had put an end to their activities and decided to disband.

After 10 years, the group announced their reunification on their official websites on March 8, 2019, and thereafter released the single Koumyou in the same year, held a number of concerts, and released a new album HORIN in 2021. 
.

Members
 (born November 20, 1979) - vocals, koto, sangen, jushichi-gen
 (born December 22, 1978) - vocals, biwa, shakuhachi
 (born May 10, 19??) - vocals, koto, sangen, jushichi-gen

Discography

Singles
 (7 April 2004)

 (30 June 2004)

Release

Release(Instrumental)
 (20 April 2005)

 (31 August 2005)

Flashback: Rin' Version

Albums
 (12 May 2004)

 (featured as the ending theme to the anime series Samurai 7)

weakness

Smile On: English ver.
Will

Eternal
 (29 September 2004)

The Grace

innocence

Nomado

Hanging in there
 (14 November 2004)
Happy Xmas (War Is Over)
Last Christmas
Rin' Xmas Medley: Silent Night / 赤鼻のトナカイ / I Saw Mommy Kissing Santa Claus / Jingle Bells / We Wish You a Merry Xmas / Silent Night

Merry Christmas Mr.Lawrence
White Christmas
In My Life (First edition-only bonus track))
 (Live album, 30 March 2005)
Inland Sea (released in U.S./Europe on 25 April 2006, in Japan on 30 August 2006) 
New Day Rising (feat. Leigh Nash)
Solemn
What the Rain Said
Never Knew What Love Meant (feat. Leigh Nash)
Moss Garden
Anti Hero (feat. Lisa Loeb)
Inland Sea
Sea of Tranquility (feat. Leigh Nash)
Superflat(Part II)
Past Imperfect
AA170
 (Japan-only bonus track)
Inland Sea -Special edition- (Includes 2 CDs and a DVD. The first CD is the same like the normal Inland Sea CD without track 12. So here is only the track list of the second CD. The DVD includes the videos of Anti Hero, Sakura Sakura (サクラ サクラ), Inland Sea Spot and Samurai Heart) 

 (5 December 2007)

Genji
 (feat. alan)

 The title comes from the poem Ihora (Ihora-uta) (jap. いろは歌 ; 伊呂波歌)

DVD
 (17 November 2004)

Other
Rin' featuring m.c.A・T Flashback (31 August 2005; used in Kamen Rider Hibiki & The Seven Senki)
Crossover Japan '05 CD/DVD (28 September 2005)
Provided traditional instrument sounds to the backing track for the single Samurai Heart [侍 Heart] recorded by Japanese pop band AAA. Released December 2006 by Avex Trax music as part of a double A side single package called Black and White, which featured the tracks Samurai Heart and Winter Lander. (Rin' only play on 'Samurai heart' and track is credited to AAA, not as a Rin' single).
In 2008 Rin' collaborated with Japanese composer Conisch on the soundtrack to a Japanese TV drama series called Hana goromo yume goromo　「花衣夢衣」. This resulted in an album of this music being released through EMI Music Japan (4 June 2008). Although this work is not acknowledged on the Rin' websites (as it is released by a record label different than their usual Avex Trax), the group get equal title credits, appearing as Rin' & Conisch. The album has 34 tracks, lasts 69 minutes and mixes Rin's traditional Japanese instruments with a full western orchestra.

References

External links
 Rin' Official Site
 新井智恵 Chie Arai Official Site
 吉永真奈 Mana Yoshinaga Official Web Site | 生田流箏曲・地歌三味線演奏家
 長須与佳 Tomoca Nagasu Official Web Site
 Rin' MySpace
 Rin'の復活を願う会
 (Blog) Rin' with Mana Yoshinaga (吉永真奈), Tomoca Nagasu (長須与佳) & Chie Arai (新井智恵)

Avex Group artists
Japanese pop music groups
Tokyo University of the Arts alumni
Musical groups from Tokyo
Japanese mythology in music
Domo Records artists